Andrés Pascal Allende (born July 12, 1943) is a Chilean Marxist dissident and nephew of former President Salvador Allende. He is of Basque and Belgian descent.

He was born in Santiago, the son of Gastón Pascal Lyon and of Laura Allende.
He studied at Saint George's College, Santiago (class of 1962).
He is former leader of the Movement of the Revolutionary Left along with Miguel Enríquez. After the Chilean coup of 1973, and upon original leader Miguel Enriquez's death in 1974, Andrés Pascal Allende took control of the MIR. Pascal's leadership stint ended relatively quickly when he fled Chile in 1976 for Cuba.

In March 1976, Orlando Bosch was arrested by Costa Rican police on suspicion of trying to assassinate Pascal and his companion Mary-Anne Beausire.

Allende’s cousin is Véronica Pascal Ureta, the mother of Chilean-American actor Pedro Pascal.

See also
Allende family
William Beausire
History of Chile

References

External links
The William Beausire case
Interview Puro Chile 
Remembrances of his times in the MIR 
Interview with biographical data 
Interview Pagina Digital 

1943 births
Allende family
Chilean people of Basque descent
Saint George's College, Santiago alumni
Chilean revolutionaries
Living people
People from Santiago
Presidency of Salvador Allende
Revolutionary Left Movement (Chile) politicians
Salvador Allende
Chilean emigrants to Cuba